Castorama is a French retailer of DIY and home improvement tools and supplies, headquartered in Templemars, France, and is part of the British group Kingfisher plc, which has 101 stores in France and 90 in Poland. The company became a subsidiary of Kingfisher plc in May 2002, along with Castorama's own subsidiary Brico Dépôt.

Some outlets have been converted or relocated under the Brico Dépôt format "DIY warehouse", based on the B&Q Warehouse fascia in the United Kingdom. In February 2009, Kingfisher sold 31 stores of Castorama in Italy to French retailer Leroy Merlin.

In 1969, Christian Dubois founded in Englos, near Lille, France's first large-scale (5000 m2) DIY store. The rapid expansion of the chain meant that 20 years later Castorama had 80 stores in France.

References

External links
 Castorama France 
 Castorama Poland 

Retail companies established in 1969
Hardware stores
Kingfisher plc
Retail companies of France
French brands